Karl Henke (born March 8, 1945) is a former American football defensive end and defensive tackle. He played for the New York Jets in 1968 and for the Boston Patriots in 1969.

References

1945 births
Living people
American football defensive ends
American football defensive tackles
Tulsa Golden Hurricane football players
New York Jets players
Boston Patriots players